Songs in the Attic is the first live album by Billy Joel, released in 1981. 

At the time of its release, it was the first widely available appearance of music from his first album, Cold Spring Harbor, released in 1971.

History
In the liner notes, Joel writes that Songs in the Attic introduced his earlier work to fans who had come to know his work after The Stranger. In that earlier work, most of the instruments were played by session musicians while Joel himself sang and played piano, keyboards, and harmonica. But by the late 1970s, Joel had a fairly consistent touring/recording band and wanted to showcase his songs as played by his band.

The single-releases included: "Say Goodbye to Hollywood", which peaked at #17 on the U. S. Billboard Hot 100; and "She's Got a Way", which reached #23 on the same chart; and "You're My Home". In Japan, "Los Angelenos" was also available in 1981.

A series of promotional music videos were filmed. Though the concert filming may have been staged for the occasion, the audio versions are nonetheless different from the live recordings featuring on the live album. A total of five promo videos were filmed: four of them recorded at Sparks Saloon in Huntington, NY, and one in a recording studio. At least two of them were not released as worldwide official singles. 
"Everybody Loves You Now" (not a single) directed by Steve Cohen (live at Sparks); 
"You're My Home" directed by Steve Cohen (live at Sparks); 
"Los Angelenos" (not a single, though a Japanese 7" vinyl was in existence) directed by Steve Cohen (live at Sparks); 
"Say Goodbye to Hollywood" directed by Steve Cohen (live at Sparks); 
"She's Got a Way" live in a studio, also a different version from the live album.

Track listing
All songs written by Billy Joel.

Personnel
Billy Joel – vocals, pianos, synthesizer, harmonica
David Brown – electric guitar (lead), acoustic guitar (lead)
Richie Cannata – saxophones, flute, organ
Liberty DeVitto – drums, percussion
Russell Javors – electric guitar (rhythm), acoustic guitar (rhythm)
Doug Stegmeyer – bass guitar
Technical
Phil Ramone - producer
Ted Jensen at Sterling Sound, NYC - mastering
James Boyer - Recording Engineer
Bradshaw Leigh - Recording Engineer
Larry Franke - Recording Engineer

Charts

Weekly charts

Year-end charts

Certifications/Sales

References

Albums produced by Phil Ramone
Billy Joel live albums
1981 live albums
Columbia Records live albums
Albums recorded at Madison Square Garden